Jean-Claude Misac (27 October 1948 – 10 September 1975) was a French racing cyclist. He rode in the 1974 Tour de France.

References

1948 births
1975 deaths
French male cyclists
Place of birth missing